Chay Kandi-ye Kheyr ol Din (also Romanized as Chāy Kandī-ye Kheyr ol Dīn and Chāy Kandī-ye Kheyr ed Dīn; also known as Chāi Kand, Chāy Kandī, and Chaykendy) is a village in Ozomdel-e Jonubi Rural District, in the Central District of Varzaqan County, East Azerbaijan Province, Iran. At the 2006 census, its population was 177, in 37 families.

References 

Towns and villages in Varzaqan County